Jirabhawani (Nepali: जिरा भवानी) is a rural municipality in Parsa District in Province No. 2 of Nepal. It was formed in 2016 occupying current 5 sections (wards) from previous 5 former VDCs. It occupies an area of 55.39 km2 with a total population of 22,765.

References 

Rural municipalities of Nepal established in 2017
Rural municipalities in Madhesh Province